Retinia impropria is a species of moth of the family Tortricidae. It is found in China (Inner Mongolia, Jilin, Heilongjiang, Yunnan), Japan, Mongolia and Russia.

The larvae feed on Larix decidua, Larix sibirica, Larix polonica and Larix dahurica.

References

Moths described in 1932
Eucosmini